Smile is a village in Alchevsk Raion (district) in Luhansk Oblast of eastern Ukraine, at about 30 km WNW from the centre of Luhansk.

The settlement was taken under control of pro-Russian forces during the War in Donbass, that started in 2014. The village stayed under pro-Russian control and is currently situated close to the front line with the Armed Forces of Ukraine.

References

Villages in Alchevsk Raion